Matthew John Armstrong (born August 28, 1973 in Chicago, Illinois, U.S.) is an American actor. He is known for roles in Turks (1999), The Profile (2010) and Heroes (2006).

Early life
Armstrong attended Naperville Central High School in Naperville, Illinois, where he played football and was the two-time Defensive Player of the Year in the DuPage Valley Conference. On May 4, 2012, he was recognized as a notable Naperville Central Alumni.

Career
Armstrong appeared in 1999 on the short-lived police drama Turks. He had a recurring role on American Dreams from 2002–2005. He portrayed an AIDS patient in an episode of House in 2005. From 2006–2007, he appeared on the television series Heroes as Ted Sprague. In 2011, he portrayed a phoenix in an episode of Supernatural. In 2012, he appeared in the second season of American Horror Story.

Cavemen mixup
Armstrong reportedly has been mistaken as one of the actors who portray cavemen in a popular series of commercials for the automobile insurance provider GEICO, due to his hairstyle and facial hair resembling the makeup used for the caveman characters.  Armstrong noted this misconception in an interview with Entertainment Weekly stating, "For the record, I am not the GEICO caveman."

Personal life
He is married to Ashley Crow, the actress who portrayed Sandra Bennet on Heroes.
He has one son, Pete Crow-Armstrong, who was selected 19th overall in the 2020 Major League Baseball Draft by the New York Mets.

References

External links

1973 births
Living people
American male film actors
American male television actors
Male actors from Chicago
20th-century American male actors